Bye Bye Havana is a 2005 fast-paced stream of consciousness documentary that presents a vibrant portrayal of Cuban life. The film juxtaposes commercialism with vintage anti-communist propaganda and the elementary difficulties that everyday Cubans face. Directed by J. Michael Seyfert the film was shot and edited in Cuba over the course of 2 years. For its enduring images, Carlos Alberto Montaner of Foreign Policy calls Seyfert's film "A colorful and sobering picture of the Cuba that Fidel has left behind".

Official Selections 
Bye Bye Havana premiered in the United States on October 16, 2005 at 20th Fort Lauderdale International Film Festival  and screened at numerous festivals around the world including on April 22, 2006 Cine Las Americas International Film Festival in Austin and 5th Annual Tiburon International Film Festival. On Dec 6th and 8th 2006 the film screened at Tallinn Black Nights Film Festival in Estonia. On February 21, 2007 Bye Bye Havana was broadcast four times on Free Speech TV and Dish Satellite Channel 9415 and 150 community access cable stations reaching a potential audience of over 25 million people. The film was broadcast on Mongolia State TV and continues to figure prominently among post-revolutionary documentaries.

Awards  
Best Post Production 2006 Atlanta International Documentary Film Festival.

Soundtrack 
Bye Bye Havana's soundtrack featuring hip hop and afro-rock musician X Alfonso and Free Hole Negro, a hip hop underground band, jazz pianist Roberto Carcasses and Cuban rapper and spoken-word artist Telmary. The film's theme song was composed and performed by the singer Francis Del Rio.

Non-Cuban contributions were made by Roger Bunn, British rock musician who narrated the film and contributed three tracks from his posthumously released album Piece of Mind featuring the Netherlands Symphony Orchestra.  American songwriter T Bone Burnett's song Humans From Earth was recorded in Bristol by British indie pop band The Flatmates produced by Paul Cooke, drummer and founding member of the British smooth jazz band SADE. Cooke also co-produced a trance dub with London DJ Herbus K. Dubington of Lagrimas Negras a 1929 bolero-son by the Cuban composer and singer Miguel Matamoros. The Cuban classic was used as a theme throughout the film in various interpretations including an acoustic guitarist and a nameless Cuban street violinist.

Reviews 
 The Culture Trip "The Best Documentaries to Watch About Cuba"
 inCUBAdora "Cuba Underground Guide"
 DVD Talk Film Review
 Academia.edu "El cine en español en los Estados Unidos"
 Ramonet vs. Montaner: el gran debate sobre Cuba

External links 
Bye Bye Havana on IMDB
Official Site

References 

2005 independent films
2005 films
Culture in Havana
Cuban musical films
Cuban culture
Latin America
Films shot in Havana
Films set in Cuba
Documentary films about poverty
Cuban documentary films
2000s Spanish-language films
2005 documentary films
2000s avant-garde and experimental films
Documentary films about Cuba
2000s musical films
Cuban avant-garde and experimental films